IFK Gävle was a sports club in Gävle, Sweden. It was founded on 12 March 1897 and the club used the old spelling of their home town's name, IFK Gefle, until 1943.

The club has been active in a great number of different sports, like bandy, figure skating, gymnastics, handball, ice hockey, soccer, tennis and track and field athletics. From  2001, only the women's soccer team section remained until the club was dissolved in November 2013.

The club was runner-up to the Swedish bandy championship in 1907, where the final game, played at home ice, was lost against IFK Uppsala.

Honours

Domestic
 Swedish Champions:
 Runners-up (1): 1907

References

External links
Official homepage

Defunct football clubs in Sweden
Defunct bandy clubs in Sweden
IFK Gävle
1897 establishments in Sweden
Association football clubs established in 1897
Bandy clubs established in 1897
Gävle
2013 disestablishments in Sweden
Sports clubs disestablished in 2013
Defunct ice hockey teams in Sweden
Defunct handball clubs